Stella Meghie is a Canadian film director and screenwriter.  She is known for her feature films Jean of the Joneses (2016), Everything, Everything (2017), The Weekend (2018), and The Photograph (2020). Meghie has also directed episodes for television series including Grown-ish, Insecure and First Wives Club.

For her debut feature, Meghie was nominated for Best First Screenplay at the Independent Spirit Awards.  She has also received nominations from the Canadian Screen Awards and NAACP Image Awards.

Early life 
Meghie was born in Toronto, Ontario to Jamaican immigrant parents.  She pursued a degree in writing at the University of Waterloo, before beginning a career as a public relations agent in New York City's fashion industry.  In 2007, she quit her job to return to school and received a degree in screenwriting from the University of Westminster.

Career
In 2016, Meghie made her feature film debut with the indie comedy-drama Jean of the Joneses which premiered at the SXSW Film Festival. The film received a nomination for Best First Screenplay at the Independent Spirit Awards and two Canadian Screen Award nominations at the 5th Canadian Screen Awards in 2017.  Meghie was also nominated in the Best Original Screenplay category.

After her first picture, Meghie began work on studio features.  She directed the romance film Everything, Everything (2017), an adaptation of the New York Times best selling novel Everything, Everything.  The film starred Amandla Stenberg and Nick Robinson and was a commercial success, grossing $61 million worldwide on a production budget of $10 million.

Marking her return to indie features, Meghie's film The Weekend premiered at the 2018 Toronto International Film Festival.  The indie film was shot in just under two weeks from a script Meghie had written years prior.

In 2020, Meghie directed her fourth feature film, The Photograph.  The film was inspired by Meghie's own grandmother who reconnected with a daughter she had not seen in almost thirty years. Starring Issa Rae and Lakeith Stanfield, the film received generally favourable reviews and grossed $20 million.

Meghie was slated to direct a Whitney Houston biopic for Sony Pictures titled I Wanna Dance With Somebody from a screenplay written by Anthony McCarten  and with Naomi Ackie set to star as Houston. Kasi Lemmons ultimately took over directing duties though Meghie will remain an executive producer.

Meghie was announced to be directing the series, titled Tiana, on November 12, 2021.

On February 22, 2023, it was announced that Meghie would direct multiple episodes of the Disney+ series Wonder Man, set in the Marvel Cinematic Universe.

Filmography

Feature films

Television

See also
 List of University of Waterloo people

References

External links
 

Canadian women screenwriters
Canadian women film directors
Black Canadian writers
Black Canadian filmmakers
Black Canadian women
Living people
Film directors from Toronto
Writers from Toronto
Canadian Film Centre alumni
Year of birth missing (living people)